Dolenje Kronovo is a village in the Municipality of Šmarješke Toplice in southeastern Slovenia. The area is part of the historical region of Lower Carniola. The municipality is now included in the Southeast Slovenia Statistical Region. 

The local church is dedicated to Saint Nicholas and belongs to the Parish of Bela Cerkev. It is a medieval church that was restyled in the Baroque in 1739.

References

External links
Dolenje Kronovo at Geopedia

Populated places in the Municipality of Šmarješke Toplice